Enixotrophon fasciolarioides is a species of sea snail, a marine gastropod mollusk in the family Muricidae, the murex snails or rock snails.

Description

Distribution

References

 Pastorino, G.; Scarabino, F. (2008). Two new deep-sea muricids (Gastropoda) from Argentina. The Nautilus, 122(2): 107–114.

External links
 Barco, A.; Marshall, B.; A. Houart, R.; Oliverio, M. (2015). Molecular phylogenetics of Haustrinae and Pagodulinae (Neogastropoda: Muricidae) with a focus on New Zealand species. Journal of Molluscan Studies. 81(4): 476–488

Gastropods described in 2008
Enixotrophon